Maximilien-Paul-Marie-Félix d'Ollone (13 June 1875 – 15 May 1959) was a 20th-century French composer.

Life and career 
Born in Besançon, d'Ollone started composing very early, entering the Paris Conservatoire at 6, winning many prizes, receiving the encouragement of Gounod, Saint-Saëns, Massenet, Thomas and Delibes. His teachers at the Conservatoire were Lavignac, Massenet, Gédalge and Lenepveu; he won the Prix de Rome in 1897.

He was director of music in Angers, professor at the Paris Conservatoire and director of the Opéra-Comique. His work was part of the music event in the art competition at the 1912 Summer Olympics. In 1932 he wrote three important articles for Le Ménestrel (29 July, 9 and 16 December) arguing for a more populist approach to composition.

In addition to the works listed below, d'Ollone produced a number of song cycles (including "Les Chants d'Ailleurs"; " Les Chants d'Exil"; "Impressions d'Automne"), which demonstrate a considerable mastery of the French mélodie. There are several works for orchestra, solo instrument and orchestra, and piano works.

Works

Stage works 
 Jean (opera in five acts, 1900-1905)
 Bacchus et Silène (ballet, 1901, Béziers)
 Le Retour (drame lyrique in two acts to his own libretto, 1911, Angers)
 Les Amants de Rimini (opera in four acts to his own libretto)
 L'Étrangère (opera in two acts)
 Les Uns et les Autres (comédie lyrique in one act with text by Paul Verlaine, 6 November 1922, Opéra-Comique)
 L'Arlequin (comédie lyrique in five acts, 22 December 1924, Paris Opera)
 George Dandin (opéra comique in three acts after Molière, 1930)
 Le Temple abandonné (one-act ballet, 1931, Monte Carlo)
 La Samaritaine (opera in three acts after Rostand, 1937, Paris)
 Olympe de Clèves (opera in four acts after Dumas, unpublished)

Chamber music 
String Quartet in D major (1898)
Piano Quartet
Fantaisie orientale for clarinet and piano (premiered 1913)
Piano Trio in A minor (published 1921)
Andante et Allegro en style ancien for flute and piano (dedicated to Philippe Gaubert, published 1926)

Concertante 
Fantaisie for piano and orchestra in E-flat major (1897)
Le menetrier, poem for violin and orchestra (published by Heugel, 1911)

Vocal music 
 Frédégonde, winning cantata for the Prix de Rome in 1897

Recordings
 Cantates et chœurs pour le prix de Rome; Brussels Philharmonic, Flemish Radio Choir, Hervé Niquet; Palazzetto Bru Zane; Ediciones Singulares, 2013.
 Les Villes Maudites, for orchestra; Brussels Philharmonic, Flemish Radio Choir, Hervé Niquet; Palazetto Bru Zane; Ediciones Singulares, 2013.
 Le Ménétrier, for violin and orchestra (1910); Mark Kaplan, Orchestra Simfonica de Barcelona i National de Catalunya, Lawrence Foster, Claves 2003.
 Lamento, for orchestra (1908); Orchestra Simfonica de Barcelona i National de Catalunya, Lawrence Foster, Claves 2003.
 Fantaisie for piano and orchestra (1999); François-Joël Thiollier, Orchestra Simfonica de Barcelona i National de Catalunya, Lawrence Foster, Claves 2003.
 La Samaritaine, opera (1937); Berthe Monmart, soprano; Tony Aubin, direction; Orchestre Lyrique de la Radio Diffusion Française et des Choeurs de la RTF, 1955, INA.
 Le Retour, opera (1912); Alain Pâris, direction; Choeur et orchestre Lyrique de Radio France, 1975.
 Mélodies vol. 1, including the cycle In Memoriam, Didier Henry, baryton, Patrice d'Ollone, piano, Maguelone.
 Mélodies Vol. 2, Elsa Maurus, mezzo-soprano; Didier Henry, baryton; Patrice d'Ollone, piano; Maguelone.
 Trio for piano, violin and cello (1920); Quatuor Athenæum Enesco and Patrice d'Ollone, piano; éd. disques Pierre Verany, Arion, 1999.
 Quartet for piano and strings (1949); Quatuor Athenæum Enesco and Patrice d'Ollone, piano; Discs Pierre Verany, Arion, 1999.
 String quartet (1898); Athenæum Enesco Quartet; Disques Pierre Verany, Arion, 1999.
 Trio for piano, violin and cello (1920); Trio Anima Mundi, Melbourne.
 Trio pour piano, violin and cello (1920); Dimitris Saroglou, piano; Gérard Poulet, violin; Dominique de Williencourt, cello; Europe et Art, 2011.
 Chamber music; Alessandro Carbonare, clarinet; Philippe Pierlot, flute; Régis Poulain, bassoon; Elisabeth Glab, violin; Jean-Luc Bourré, Emmanuel Petit, Emma Savouret, Stéphane Manent, cello; Isabelle Perrin, harp; Parisii Quartet; Patrice d'Ollone, piano; Angéline Pondepeyre, piano; Maguelone, 2005.
 Fantaisie orientale (1913); Sylvie Hue, clarinet; Roger Boutry, piano, REM.
 Andante et scherzo, for three cellos (1933); Gürzenich Cello Trio, Westdeutscher Rundfunk, Köln, ANA records.
 Andante et scherzo, for three cellos (1933); Members of Orchestra Simfonica de Barcelona i National de Catalunya, Claves 2003.
 Romance et tarentelle (1928); Régis Poulain, bassoon; and Angeline Pondepeyre, piano; Maguelone, 1996.
 Etudes de concert (1904); Dimitris Saroglou, piano; Europe et Art, 2011.

References

Biographies 
 Alexandre Dratwicki and Patrice d'Ollone: Max d'Ollone and the Prix de Rome (Venise, Palazetto Bru-Zane, 2013).
 Georges Favre: Silhouettes du Conservatoire : Charles-Marie Widor, André Gédalge, Max d'Ollone (La Pensée universelle, 1986).
 Henri Rabaud: Correspondance avec Daniel Halévy et Max d'Ollone et écrits de jeunesse.
 Euridyce Jousse and Yves Gérard: Lettres de compositeurs à Camille Saint-Saëns (Symétrie, 2009).
 Julia Lu and Alexandre Dratwicki: Le concours du prix de Rome de musique (Symétrie et Palazetto bru-Zane, 2011).
 Brigitte François-Sappey and Gilles Cantagrel: Guide de la mélodie et du lied (Fayard, 1994).
 René Dumesnil: La musique en France entre les deux guerres, (Editions du milieu du monde, 1946).
 Karine Le Bail: La musique au pas, être musicien sous l'occupation (CNRS Editions, 2016).
 Yannick Simon: Composer sous Vichy (Symétrie, 2009).
 Rose-Noëlle Lenain: Max d'Ollone ou les partances vaines, mémoires de musicologie (Université Paris-Sorbonne, 1989).

External links 

1875 births
1959 deaths
French opera librettists
Opera managers
French opera composers
Male opera composers
French classical composers
French male classical composers
French ballet composers
Musicians from Besançon
Conservatoire de Paris alumni
Academic staff of the Conservatoire de Paris
French theatre directors
Prix de Rome for composition
Pupils of Jules Massenet
French male dramatists and playwrights
Olympic competitors in art competitions